Novica Simić (Serbian Cyrillic: Новица Симић; 18 November 1948 – 2 March 2012) was a Bosnian Serb military general during the Bosnian War.

In 2022 "March of General Novica Simić" was composed by Dušan Pokrajčić, for his merit in Operation Corridor, which connected two parts of Serbian Republic.

Awards/Recognitions 
 Nemanjić award
 Order of the Star of Karađorđe, 1st level
 Bravery award of the Yugoslav People's Army
 Ribbon of Modriča, posthumously awarded 2012

Published books 
 Koridor 92, Veterans Association of Republika Srpska, Banja Luka (2011)

Personal
His brother Goran Simić is a poet who supported the Bosnian government during the war. His son is writer Danijel Simić.

References

1948 births
2012 deaths
People from Milići
Military personnel from Sarajevo
Serbs of Bosnia and Herzegovina
Serbian generals
Army of Republika Srpska soldiers
Officers of the Yugoslav People's Army